Zeno's paradoxes are a set of philosophical problems devised by the Eleatic Greek philosopher Zeno of Elea (c. 490–430 BC).

History 
The origins of the paradoxes are somewhat unclear, but they are generally thought to have been developed to support Parmenides' doctrine of monism, that all of reality is one, and that all change is impossible. Diogenes Laërtius, citing Favorinus, says that Zeno's teacher Parmenides was the first to introduce the paradox of Achilles and the tortoise. But in a later passage, Laërtius attributes the origin of the paradox to Zeno, explaining that Favorinus disagrees. 

Many of these paradoxes argue that contrary to the evidence of one's senses, motion is nothing but an illusion. It is usually assumed, based on Plato's Parmenides (128a–d), that Zeno took on the project of creating these paradoxes because other philosophers had created paradoxes against Parmenides' view.  Zeno's arguments are perhaps the first examples of a method of proof called reductio ad absurdum, also known as proof by contradiction. Thus Plato has Zeno say the purpose of the paradoxes "is to show that their hypothesis that existences are many, if properly followed up, leads to still more absurd results than the hypothesis that they are one." Plato has Socrates claim that Zeno and Parmenides were essentially arguing exactly the same point. They are also credited as a source of the dialectic method used by Socrates.

Paradoxes 
Some of Zeno's nine surviving paradoxes (preserved in Aristotle's Physics and Simplicius's commentary thereon) are essentially equivalent to one another. Aristotle offered a response to some of them.   Popular literature often misrepresents Zeno's arguments. For example, Zeno is often said to have argued that the sum of an infinite number of terms must itself be infinite–with the result that not only the time, but also the distance to be travelled, become infinite.  However, none of the original ancient sources has Zeno discussing the sum of any infinite series. Simplicius has Zeno saying "it is impossible to traverse an infinite number of things in a finite time". This presents Zeno's problem not with finding the sum, but rather with finishing a task with an infinite number of steps: how can one ever get from A to B, if an infinite number of (non-instantaneous) events can be identified that need to precede the arrival at B, and one cannot reach even the beginning of a "last event"?

Paradoxes of motion 
Three of the strongest and most famous—that of Achilles and the tortoise, the Dichotomy argument, and that of an arrow in flight—are presented in detail below.

Dichotomy paradox 

Suppose Atalanta wishes to walk to the end of a path. Before she can get there, she must get halfway there. Before she can get halfway there, she must get a quarter of the way there. Before traveling a quarter, she must travel one-eighth; before an eighth, one-sixteenth; and so on.

The resulting sequence can be represented as:

This description requires one to complete an infinite number of tasks, which Zeno maintains is an impossibility.

This sequence also presents a second problem in that it contains no first distance to run, for any possible (finite) first distance could be divided in half, and hence would not be first after all. Hence, the trip cannot even begin. The paradoxical conclusion then would be that travel over any finite distance can be neither completed nor begun, and so all motion must be an illusion.

This argument is called the "Dichotomy" because it involves repeatedly splitting a distance into two parts. An example with the original sense can be found in an asymptote. It is also known as the Race Course paradox.

Achilles and the tortoise 

In the paradox of Achilles and the tortoise, Achilles is in a footrace with the tortoise. Achilles allows the tortoise a head start of 100 meters, for example. Suppose that each racer starts running at some constant speed, one faster than the other. After some finite time, Achilles will have run 100 meters, bringing him to the tortoise's starting point. During this time, the tortoise has run a much shorter distance, say 2 meters. It will then take Achilles some further time to run that distance, by which time the tortoise will have advanced farther; and then more time still to reach this third point, while the tortoise moves ahead. Thus, whenever Achilles arrives somewhere the tortoise has been, he still has some distance to go before he can even reach the tortoise. As Aristotle noted, this argument is similar to the Dichotomy. It lacks, however, the apparent conclusion of motionlessness.

Arrow paradox 

In the arrow paradox, Zeno states that for motion to occur, an object must change the position which it occupies. He gives an example of an arrow in flight. He states that at any one (duration-less) instant of time, the arrow is neither moving to where it is, nor to where it is not.
It cannot move to where it is not, because no time elapses for it to move there; it cannot move to where it is, because it is already there. In other words, at every instant of time there is no motion occurring.  If everything is motionless at every instant, and time is entirely composed of instants, then motion is impossible.

Whereas the first two paradoxes divide space, this paradox starts by dividing time—and not into segments, but into points.

Other paradoxes 
Aristotle gives three other paradoxes.

Paradox of place 
From Aristotle:

Paradox of the grain of millet 
Description of the paradox from the Routledge Dictionary of Philosophy:

Aristotle's response:

Description from Nick Huggett:

The moving rows (or stadium) 

From Aristotle:

For an expanded account of Zeno's arguments as presented by Aristotle, see Simplicius's commentary On Aristotle's Physics.

Proposed solutions

In classical antiquity 
According to Simplicius, Diogenes the Cynic said nothing upon hearing Zeno's arguments, but stood up and walked, in order to demonstrate the falsity of Zeno's conclusions (see solvitur ambulando). To fully solve any of the paradoxes, however, one needs to show what is wrong with the argument, not just the conclusions. Through history, several solutions have been proposed, among the earliest recorded being those of Aristotle and Archimedes.

Aristotle (384 BC−322 BC) remarked that as the distance decreases, the time needed to cover those distances also decreases, so that the time needed also becomes increasingly small.
Aristotle also distinguished "things infinite in respect of divisibility" (such as a unit of space that can be mentally divided into ever smaller units while remaining spatially the same) from things (or distances) that are infinite in extension ("with respect to their extremities").
Aristotle's objection to the arrow paradox was that "Time is not composed of indivisible nows any more than any other magnitude is composed of indivisibles." Thomas Aquinas, commenting on Aristotle's objection, wrote "Instants are not parts of time, for time is not made up of instants any more than a magnitude is made of points, as we have already proved. Hence it does not follow that a thing is not in motion in a given time, just because it is not in motion in any instant of that time."

In modern mathematics 
Some mathematicians and historians, such as Carl Boyer, hold that Zeno's paradoxes are simply mathematical problems, for which modern calculus provides a mathematical solution. Infinite processes remained theoretically troublesome in mathematics until the late 19th century. With the epsilon-delta definition of limit, Weierstrass and Cauchy developed a rigorous formulation of the logic and calculus involved. These works resolved the mathematics involving infinite processes.

Some philosophers, however, say that Zeno's paradoxes and their variations (see Thomson's lamp) remain relevant metaphysical problems. While mathematics can calculate where and when the moving Achilles will overtake the Tortoise of Zeno's paradox, philosophers such as Kevin Brown and Francis Moorcroft claim that mathematics does not address the central point in Zeno's argument, and that solving the mathematical issues does not solve every issue the paradoxes raise. Brown concludes "Given the history of 'final resolutions', from Aristotle onwards, it's probably foolhardy to think we've reached the end. It may be that Zeno's arguments on motion, because of their simplicity and universality, will always serve as a kind of 'Rorschach image' onto which people can project their most fundamental phenomenological concerns (if they have any)."

Henri Bergson 
An alternative conclusion, proposed by Henri Bergson in his 1896 book Matter and Memory, is that, while the path is divisible, the motion is not.

Peter Lynds 

In 2003, Peter Lynds argued that all of Zeno's motion paradoxes are resolved by the conclusion that instants in time and instantaneous magnitudes do not physically exist. Lynds argues that an object in relative motion cannot have an instantaneous or determined relative position (for if it did, it could not be in motion), and so cannot have its motion fractionally dissected as if it does, as is assumed by the paradoxes.  Nick Huggett argues that Zeno is assuming the conclusion when he says that objects that occupy the same space as they do at rest must be at rest.

Bertrand Russell 
Based on the work of Georg Cantor, Bertrand Russell offered a solution to the paradoxes, what is known as the "at-at theory of motion". It agrees that there can be no motion "during" a durationless instant, and contends that all that is required for motion is that the arrow be at one point at one time, at another point another time, and at appropriate points between those two points for intervening times. In this view motion is just change in position over time.

Hermann Weyl 
Another proposed solution is to question one of the assumptions Zeno used in his paradoxes (particularly the Dichotomy), which is that between any two different points in space (or time), there is always another point. Without this assumption there are only a finite number of distances between two points, hence there is no infinite sequence of movements, and the paradox is resolved. According to Hermann Weyl, the assumption that space is made of finite and discrete units is subject to a further problem, given by the "tile argument" or "distance function problem". According to this, the length of the hypotenuse of a right angled triangle in discretized space is always equal to the length of one of the two sides, in contradiction to geometry. Jean Paul Van Bendegem has argued that the Tile Argument can be resolved, and that discretization can therefore remove the paradox.

Applications

Quantum Zeno effect 

In 1977, physicists E. C. George Sudarshan and B. Misra discovered that the dynamical evolution (motion) of a quantum system can be hindered (or even inhibited) through observation of the system. This effect is usually called the "quantum Zeno effect" as it is strongly reminiscent of Zeno's arrow paradox. This effect was first theorized in 1958.

Zeno behaviour 
In the field of verification and design of timed and hybrid systems, the system behaviour is called Zeno if it includes an infinite number of discrete steps in a finite amount of time. Some formal verification techniques exclude these behaviours from analysis, if they are not equivalent to non-Zeno behaviour. In systems design these behaviours will also often be excluded from system models, since they cannot be implemented with a digital controller.

In popular culture
A humorous take is offered by Tom Stoppard in his 1972 play Jumpers, in which the principal protagonist, the philosophy professor George Moore, suggests that according to Zeno's paradox, Saint Sebastian, a 3rd Century Christian saint martyred by being shot with arrows, died of fright.

Similar paradoxes

School of Names 

Roughly contemporaneously during the Warring States period (475–221 BCE), ancient Chinese philosophers from the School of Names, a school of thought similarly concerned with logic and dialectics, developed paradoxes similar to those of Zeno. The works of the School of Names have largely been lost, with the exception of portions of the Gongsun Longzi. The second of the Ten Theses of Hui Shi suggests knowledge of infinitesimals:That which has no thickness cannot be piled up; yet it is a thousand li in dimension. Among the many puzzles of his recorded in the Zhuangzi is one very similar to Zeno's Dichotomy:  The Mohist canon appears to propose a solution to this paradox by arguing that in moving across a measured length, the distance is not covered in successive fractions of the length, but in one stage. Due to the lack of surviving works from the School of Names, most of the other paradoxes listed are difficult to interpret.

Lewis Carroll and Douglas Hofstadter 
What the Tortoise Said to Achilles, written in 1895 by Lewis Carroll, was an attempt to reveal an analogous paradox in the realm of pure logic. If Carroll's argument is valid, the implication is that Zeno's paradoxes of motion are not essentially problems of space and time, but go right to the heart of reasoning itself. Douglas Hofstadter made Carroll's article a centrepiece of his book Gödel, Escher, Bach: An Eternal Golden Braid, writing many more dialogues between Achilles and the Tortoise to elucidate his arguments. Hofstadter connects Zeno's paradoxes to Gödel's incompleteness theorem in an attempt to demonstrate that the problems raised by Zeno are pervasive and manifest in formal systems theory, computing and the philosophy of mind.

See also 
 Incommensurable magnitudes
 Infinite regress
 Philosophy of space and time
 Renormalization
 Ross–Littlewood paradox
 Supertask
 Zeno machine
 List of Paradoxes

Notes

References 

 Kirk, G. S., J. E. Raven, M. Schofield (1984) The Presocratic Philosophers: A Critical History with a Selection of Texts, 2nd ed. Cambridge University Press. .
 
 Plato (1926) Plato: Cratylus. Parmenides. Greater Hippias. Lesser Hippias, H. N. Fowler (Translator), Loeb Classical Library. .
 Sainsbury, R.M. (2003) Paradoxes, 2nd ed. Cambridge University Press. .

External links 

 Dowden, Bradley. "Zeno’s Paradoxes." Entry in the Internet Encyclopedia of Philosophy.
 
 Introduction to Mathematical Philosophy, Ludwig-Maximilians-Universität München
 Silagadze, Z. K. "Zeno meets modern science,"
 Zeno's Paradox: Achilles and the Tortoise by Jon McLoone, Wolfram Demonstrations Project.
 Kevin Brown on Zeno and the Paradox of Motion
 
 
 

Philosophical paradoxes
Supertasks
Mathematical paradoxes
Paradoxes of infinity
Physical paradoxes